Ocepesuchus (meaning "Ocepe crocodile", in reference to the OCP, or Office Chérifien des Phosphates, a phosphate-mining company that participated in the excavation of the specimen) is an extinct genus of gavialoid crocodilian, related to modern gharials. It lived in the Late Cretaceous of Morocco. Described by Jouve and colleagues in 2008, the type species is O. eoafricanus, with the specific name meaning "dawn African" in reference to its great age relative to other African crocodilians. Ocepesuchus had a long snout with a tubular shape, wider than high. It is the oldest known true crocodilian from Africa.

Ocepesuchus is based on OCP DEK-GE 45, a crushed but mostly complete skull from late Maastrichtian (Late Cretaceous)-age rocks in the Oulad Abdoun Basin, in the vicinity of Khouribga, Morocco. The individual is interpreted as a small adult. The end of the snout and part of the bottom surface of the skull are missing. Jouve and colleagues performed a cladistic analysis incorporating their new taxon, and found Ocepesuchus to be a gavialoid.

A 2022 phylogenetic study by Iijima et al. recovered Ocepesuchus within Gavialinae, deeply nested within Gavialoidea, as shown in the cladogram below:

References

Gavialidae
Late Cretaceous crocodylomorphs of Africa
Prehistoric pseudosuchian genera
Fossils of Morocco
Cretaceous Morocco
Fossil taxa described in 2008